The 52 members of the Parliament of Vanuatu from 2002 to 2004 were elected on 2 May 2002.

List of members

References

 2002